A by-election for the seat of Hartley in the New South Wales Legislative Assembly was held on 14 August 1894 because Joseph Cook had been appointed Postmaster General in the Reid ministry. Such ministerial by-elections were usually uncontested and four ministers were re-elected unopposed, James Brunker (East Maitland), Joseph Carruthers (St George), Jacob Garrard (Sherbrooke) and James Young (The Manning). A poll was required in Bathurst (Sydney Smith), Hartley, Singleton (Albert Gould) and Sydney-King (George Reid) however all were comfortably re-elected.

Background
Cook was one of 35  members elected at the 1891 New South Wales colonial election and was the leader of the Parliamentary Labour Party from 1893. The party was divided on the question of free trade or protectionism, with Cook on the side of free trade, but increasingly at odds with the party. The party decided that members must sign a "pledge" to be bound by decisions of the Caucus and Cook was the leader of those parliamentarians who refused to sign, contesting the 1894 election as an  candidate. Cook's decision, immediately after the election, to join the  ministry under George Reid was seen as an opportunistic act which saw Cook labeled as a class traitor.

Dates

Result

Joseph Cook was appointed Postmaster General in the Reid ministry.

See also
Electoral results for the district of Hartley (New South Wales)
List of New South Wales state by-elections

Notes

References

1894 elections in Australia
New South Wales state by-elections
1890s in New South Wales